Mecseknádasd is a town in Baranya county, Hungary. Until the end of World War II, the inhabitants were Danube Swabians. Most of the former German Settlers were expelled to Germany and Austria in 1945–1948, following the Potsdam Agreement.
Only a few Germans of Hungary live there today. The majority are the descendants of Hungarians from the Czechoslovak–Hungarian population exchange.

Sightseeings

In the cemetery hill there is an old, Árpád-age Romanesque church, which was originally the parish church of the village.

In front of the elementary school behind the Bishop's Palace is a statue of Franz Liszt.

Moreover, the village cultivates the remembrance of Saint Margaret of Scotland. She was the daughter of the English prince Edward the Exile, son of Edmund Ironside. She was born at Castle Réka, Mecseknádasd.

References

External links
Official side Mecseknádasd

Populated places in Baranya County
Romanesque architecture in Hungary